Kronstadt, 1921, is a history book by Paul Avrich about the 1921 Kronstadt rebellion against the Bolsheviks.

In a 2003 bibliography of the era, Jon Smele summarized the book as, "masterfully written" and "the only full-length, scholarly, non-partisan account of the genesis, course and repression of the rebellion to have appeared in English."

Notes

References

External links 

 
 

1970 non-fiction books
American history books
Books by Paul Avrich
English-language books
History books about anarchism
History books about Russia
Princeton University Press books